Rosudgeon is a hamlet in the civil parish of Perranuthnoe in west Cornwall, England, United Kingdom, situated on the A394 Penzance to Helston road.

References

External links

 

Penwith
Hamlets in Cornwall